Miroslav Forman (born August 15, 1990) is a Czech professional ice hockey player. He played with HC Sparta Praha in the Czech Extraliga during the 2010–11 Czech Extraliga season.

References

External links

1990 births
Czech ice hockey forwards
HC Sparta Praha players
Living people
Motor České Budějovice players
HC Stadion Litoměřice players
HC Berounští Medvědi players
People from Kralupy nad Vltavou
Sportspeople from the Central Bohemian Region